KWLF (98.1 FM, "Wolf 98.1") is a commercial radio station in Fairbanks, Alaska.  KWLF airs a Pop CHR/Top 40 music format.

External links
 Official Website
 

1987 establishments in Alaska
WLF
Radio stations established in 1987
WLF